Kisújszállás is a town in Jász-Nagykun-Szolnok county, in the Northern Great Plain region of central Hungary.

Geography

Politics 
The current mayor of Kisújszállás is István Kecze (Fidesz-KDNP-Nagykun Civilian Circle).

The local Municipal Assembly, elected at the 2019 local government elections, is made up of 11 members (1 Mayor, 8 Individual constituencies MEPs and 3 Compensation List MEPs) divided into this political parties and alliances:

Notable inhabitants
Katalin Karikó, Hungarian-American biochemist specializing in RNA-mediated mechanisms

Twin towns – sister cities

Kisújszállás is twinned with:

 Eberschwang, Austria (1992)
 Pačir (Bačka Topola), Serbia (1996)
 Săcele, Romania (1999)
 Serne, Ukraine (2000)
 Spišská Nová Ves, Slovakia (1998)
 Wilamowice, Poland (2004)

References

External links

  in Hungarian, English and German

Populated places in Jász-Nagykun-Szolnok County